WFIT (89.5 FM), is a National Public Radio member station serving the Space Coast. Broadcasts originate from the WFIT Studios on the campus of the Florida Institute of Technology in Melbourne, Florida.

Programming
WFIT's current weekday daytime programming is a mix of "Triple A" (Adult Album Alternative) music. The station's flagship daytime show produced by the station is Sound Waves, hosted by the station's program director, Steve Yasko. The program frequently features live musical sessions and interviews with local and touring bands. Sound Waves is followed by NPR distributed Triple A program World Cafe.

WFIT's weekend and evening music broadcasts include a wide mix of genres and programs, including folk, bluegrass, blues, jazz, world music, classical, Latin, new-age, reggae, and American variety.

The station also broadcasts several syndicated talk and news shows, including Democracy Now!, Morning Edition, All Things Considered, and Tech Nation. WFIT also produces community content segments Coastal Connection, International Student Spotlight, Psychology Science Minute, and Linking the Arts.

WFIT also airs local news briefs produced by Florida Today newspaper.

History
In April 1975, Florida Institute of Technology (Florida Tech) launched its noncommercial educational radio station, WFIT, a student-run college radio station. In the 1980s, WFIT was regarded as one of the top alternative music college radio stations in the country. Its programming included alternative rock, punk rock, hardcore, post-punk, new wave, synthpop, classical, jazz, reggae, blues and funk. In the early 1980s the station promoted itself as "The New Music Leader."

In 1985, there were about 65 volunteers involved in running the station, of which approximately 40 percent were FIT students.

In 1986, WFIT applied to the FCC to increase its transmitter power to 20,000 watts, but was denied. The same year, its transmitter was stolen.

In 1988 and 1989, WFIT was recognized as one of the top five college radio stations in the USA by The Gavin Report, an industry trade publication. In 1989, the four other college radio stations WFIT competed with for top honors were the University of California at San Francisco [KUSF], the University of Washington in Seattle [KCMU until April 2, 2001], Georgia State University [WRAS], and Tulane University [WTUL] in New Orleans.

In 1990 there were 80 people on staff, including 49 DJs.

In March 1993 WFIT dropped its daytime alternative rock format in favor of a contemporary jazz sound similar to that heard on WLOQ-FM (103.1) in Winter Park. This same year, the station was interconnected with the public radio satellite system, and two years later, WFIT became an affiliate of National Public Radio. As an NPR affiliate station, WFIT's programming strives to encourage lifelong learning for listeners through thought-provoking news and programs. From local segments such as the Psychology Science Minute, Inside Florida Tech, Florida Tech Faculty and Staff Profiles, and Florida Tech International Student Spotlights, to syndicated NPR news and "Democracy Now!", WFIT provides distinct perspectives and top-notch journalism. This programming of public radio news shows, as well as a variety of other culturally diverse music and educational programs, has become the mainstay of WFIT's community outreach and service.

In 1998 an FCC-approved power increase to 8 kilowatts extended the station's signal to include more Brevard County listeners, reaching north to Cocoa and Cocoa Beach, as well as south to Vero Beach in Indian River County. Automated equipment has enabled the station to broadcast twenty-four hours a day, seven days a week, maximizing the range of audiences served. WFIT upgraded its transmitter in 2004 and became the first radio station in Brevard County to broadcast in HD Radio. WFIT's programming is also streamed worldwide via the web at wfit.org.

In 2006, the station changed its daytime broadcasting to Triple A format with the introduction of in-house produced Sound Waves, followed by NPR distributed World Cafe.

In 2012, the station moved to a newly built 5000 sq. ft. broadcast center next to Florida Tech's Gleason Performing Arts Center. The new building contains six recording studios, a performance studio, and a conference studio.

Community involvement
WFIT's nearly 30 DJs are community volunteers. WFIT sponsors concerts throughout the community featuring both local musicians and national acts.

The station also collaborates with the Florida Historical Society to produce a weekly Florida Frontiers radio segment designed to "explore the relevance of Florida history to contemporary society and promote awareness of heritage and culture tourism options in the state."

WFIT is funded in part by individual memberships, corporate underwriting, state and local grants, the Corporation for Public Broadcasting and Florida Institute of Technology.

References

External links
 WFIT official website
 

NPR member stations
Florida Institute of Technology
FIT
FIT
1975 establishments in Florida
Radio stations established in 1975